Alferius (930–1050) was an Italian abbot and saint.

Life
Alferius was born in Salerno to the noble Pappacarbona family. He spent many years in service to Guaimar. Prince of Salerno. In 1002 Alferius was named to head a delegation from his city to King Robert II of France. Taking ill during the journey, he convalesced at the monastery of S. Michele della Chiusa.  While there, he met Odilo of Cluny and vowed to become a monk himself if he recovered. He spent some time at Cluny before returning to Salerno.

Around 1020, he withdrew to the foot of Monte Finestra, southwest of Cava, where he lived a life of contemplation and prayer. At the beginning of the 11th century, a nucleus of hermit monks, attracted by the famed saintliness of Alferius, joined him. In 1101, he founded the monastery of La Trinità della Cava. It followed the Benedictine rule.

Veneration
The first four abbots of Cava were officially recognized as saints on December 21, 1893, by Pope Leo XIII.  The first four abbots are Alferius; Leo I (1050–79); Peter of Pappacarbone (1079–1123); and Constabilis.

See also
Cava de' Tirreni, Italy (Italia)
La Trinità della Cava

Notes

Bibliography 
Joseph Ratzinger: Sainti. Gli autentici apologeti della Chiesa., Lindau Edizioni, Torino 2007.

External links
 San Alferio
Alferius of La Cava

930 births
1050 deaths
Italian abbots
Italian Benedictines
11th-century Italian clergy
11th-century Christian saints
People from Salerno
Medieval Italian saints